Meshkenan or Moshkenan may refer to:
 Moshkenan, Isfahan
 Meshkenan, Kerman